Corban may refer to:

Corban, Switzerland, a municipality in the district of Delémont in the canton of Jura
Corban C. Farwell Homestead, a historic house in New Hampshire
Corban University, a small college in Oregon
Korban, a sacrifice or offering given to God among the ancient Hebrews
Qurban, a ritual animal sacrifice during the Islamic holiday of Eid al-Adha

People
Corban of Cluana (died c.732), Irish saint
Corban Joseph (born 1988), American baseball player
Corban Knight (born 1990), Canadian ice hockey player
Corban McGregor (born 1994), Australian rugby league player
Corban Wroe (born 1992), Australian basketball player